Antonio Bertolaja FRPSL was an Italian philatelist who was appointed to the Roll of Distinguished Philatelists in 1999. He formed leading collections of the Cape of Good Hope and Newfoundland and was a fellow of the Royal Philatelic Society of London who awarded him their Tilleard Medal.

Selected publications
 My romance with the Cape. David Feldman SA, Switzerland, 2002.

References

Italian philatelists
Signatories to the Roll of Distinguished Philatelists
Fellows of the Royal Philatelic Society London
Year of birth missing
Year of death missing